WGCC-FM (90.7 FM) is an American college radio station broadcasting an album oriented rock format in Batavia, New York. The station is owned by Genesee Community College. It is located on the third floor of school's Batavia Campus and was run primarily by students who worked there.

WGCC broadcasts with 880 watts effective radiated power (ERP), which gives the station an average broadcast radius of 25 miles. Its antenna has a height above average terrain (HAAT) of 50 meters. The FCC regulations for ERP and HAAT are listed under Title 47, Part 73 of the Code of Federal Regulations (CFR).

History
On November 13, 1985, the radio station first became licensed by the Federal Communications Commission (FCC) thanks to the station's founding father, Chuck Platt. The station was later advised by GCC faculty member Barry Chow.

It started out as a mixed format radio station, which included some local bands, along with current favorites like Michael Jackson and The Moody Blues, as well as some classic favorites like The Beatles. At one point, WGCC-FM played some rap, but the genre was put out of rotation due to the demographics of the area at the time. The station's demographic range covered many genres, as students were allowed to play whatever type of music they chose.

Gennesee Community College surrendered WGCC-FM's license to the FCC on February 25, 2022, and it was cancelled the same day; WGCC-FM rescinded the request in March and received its license back. In December 2022, amid SUNY's phaseout of FCC-licensed college radio, it sold WGCC-FM to Family Life Network, which will convert the station to its in-house contemporary Christian format. Since WGCC's coverage area substantially overlaps existing owned-and-operated station WCOU in Attica, Family Life intends on relocating 90.7's city of license to Kendall and its call sign to WCGI (Where Christ Grants Immortality).

WGCC Rockfest
WGCC hosted a concert called Rockfest. Local bands to the Rochester/Buffalo area such as Down To Earth Approach and New Skin have played at this concert. In 2000, Disturbed was the headlining band for Rockfest, but due to unfortunate circumstances, they were unable to play, thus canceling that year's show. Another band who was a hopeful for Rockfest 2006 was Kittie, but due to a previously scheduled touring event, they were scratched from the lineup. As of the fall of 2012, Rockfest was no more, and had been replaced by Play Eat and Trick or Treat, an indoor trick-or-treat activity for local children.

1986: WGCC 1st Anniversary Celebration
-Loosely Tight
-Trolls 
-Reporter

2000: Monsters of Mock
-Battery 
-People of the Sun
-Grafix 420
-Nic-Fit

2007: Benefit for Wilmot Cancer Center
-Secret Lives!
-Karate High School
-Urgency
-The Con
-Pollock
-Broken Frame

2008: Benefit For Salvation Army
-Take The Lead
-Amongst the Run
-The Gifted Children
-Burn Down Broadway 
-The Reign of Kindo

2009: Benefit for WNY Make a Wish Foundation
-P-Frame
-Golden Bar
-Pam Swarts
-Red October
-Non Applicable 
-Sonny Mayo Band

2010
-MC Chris
-Schaffer The Darklord
-James Kurdzel

2011: A Benefit for Pubadu
-Beard Without A Mustache 
-Drew Richter
-Wyatt Coin
-Keaton 
-My Friend Jane

References

External links

The Sports Jungle
The Frontline Morning Show
The Classic Rock/Sports Show

GCC-FM
Radio stations established in 1987
1987 establishments in New York (state)
GCC-FM